Fresno is an unincorporated community and census-designated place (CDP) in Fort Bend County, Texas, United States. The local population was 24,486 as of the 2020 census, up from 19,069 at the 2010 census, and 6,603 at the 2000 census.

Fresno is located in the extra-territorial jurisdiction (ETJ) of Houston, which is the fourth largest city in the nation in population. Fresno is bordered by Houston to the north, the suburban Fort Bend County cities of Missouri City to the west and northwest, Arcola to the south and southwest, and the Brazoria County city of Pearland to the east.

Geography

Fresno is located in eastern Fort Bend County at  (29.526728, -95.459849). The eastern edge of Fresno is the Brazoria County line.

History
A settler from Fresno, California, reportedly chose the name. The town is on land patented in 1880 once surrounded by cotton plantations. Fresno acquired a post office in 1910. In 1914 it had a telephone connection, a general store, a hardware store, and a population of 32. By 1933 the town had only ten inhabitants and one business. In 1936 it had three rows of dwellings on both sides of a paved highway (old Hwy 288, present day FM 521) and was served by the International-Great Northern Railroad. By 1946 the population had risen to 100, a level maintained throughout the 1960s. In 1970 the figure had increased to 120; two years later it had grown to 161. During the 1970s and 1980s the population of Fresno increased more rapidly as the area was affected by growth of Houston.

Growth in the 1990s and 2000s 
With its prime location on FM 521 and north of State Highway 6 in unincorporated Fort Bend County, developers have recently built large bedroom communities over what was once forest and grazing land, and a number of first-time homeowners have made the Fresno area home.

The demographics in the Fresno area have changed dramatically since the last United States Census in 2000 due to a large increase in home building.

Among the largest communities in Fresno are the six neighborhoods that make up the Fort Bend MUD #23 area. Teal Run, the oldest of the neighborhoods, was originally started in the 1980s, and development stopped with the Houston oil crash in the late 1980s. Construction in the subdivision started again in 1992.

The Estates of Teal Run, located at the intersection of Raab and Sycamore Road, was started in 1999.

Teal Run North (Villages of Teal Run and Teal Run Meadows), located just off Teal Bend Boulevard, directly adjacent to both Teal Run and Teal Run Estates, was started in 2001. There are over 3,100 total homes in the Fort Bend MUD #23 area in 2006.

NewPoint Estates, located across from Teal Run on Highway 6 and Darby Road, is an area for acreage-type home sites, stables and expensive properties. A number of Houston area professional athletes make this neighborhood home.

Winfield Lakes, which is located on Trammel Fresno Road, was started in 2004.

Andover Farms, which is located on Highway 6 and South Post Oak Road, was started in 2004.

Cambridge Falls, a David Weekley homes site located next to Winfield Lakes, started with infrastructure additions (lights, gas, water, sewer lines, streets) in 2005 and has built many spec homes, which are now available for purchase.

The average commute time for those living in eastern Fort Bend County using the full route from Highway 6 to Loop 610 (when it opens) should average 20 minutes. A typical trip down FM 521, which turns into Almeda in Houston, or State Highway 288 north into the Texas Medical Center, takes at least 30–45 minutes in rush hour traffic.

A Houston Chronicle article from February 25, 2007, titled "Straddling urban, rural in Fresno" highlights the unregulated nature of Fresno.

Demographics

As of the 2020 United States census, there were 24,486 people, 7,247 households, and 5,789 families residing in the CDP.

As of the census of 2000, there were 6,603 people, 1,881 households, and 1,600 families residing in the CDP. The population density was 734.8 people per square mile (283.6/km2). There were 2,002 housing units at an average density of 222.8/sq mi (86.0/km2). The racial makeup of the CDP was 44.36% White, 26.55% African American, 0.41% Native American, 1.08% Asian, 0.03% Pacific Islander, 25.23% from other races, and 2.35% from two or more races. Hispanic or Latino of any race were 49.89% of the population.

There were 1,881 households, out of which 54.1% had children under the age of 18 living with them, 68.6% were married couples living together, 12.0% had a female householder with no husband present, and 14.9% were non-families. 12.4% of all households were made up of individuals, and 2.8% had someone living alone who was 65 years of age or older. The average household size was 3.51 and the average family size was 3.83.

In the CDP, the population was spread out, with 36.1% under the age of 18, 9.0% from 18 to 24, 34.6% from 25 to 44, 16.0% from 45 to 64, and 4.4% who were 65 years of age or older. The median age was 28 years. For every 100 females, there were 102.2 males. For every 100 females age 18 and over, there were 99.7 males.

The median income for a household in the CDP was $46,290, and the median income for a family was $48,824. Males had a median income of $32,606 versus $30,527 for females. The per capita income for the CDP was $14,340. About 10.9% of families and 15.3% of the population were below the poverty line, including 20.6% of those under age 18 and 17.0% of those age 65 or over.
 
The Fresno area is patrolled by the Fort Bend County Sheriff's Office. The Teal Bend subdivision is also patrolled by contract deputies of the Precinct 1 Constable's Office. The Fresno Volunteer Fire Department provides fire protection. Fort Bend EMS provides emergency medical services to the area.

Government and infrastructure
The United States Postal Service operates the Fresno Post Office at 2723 Farm to Market Road 521. The Postal Service recently broke ground for a new  post office to be located in the front entrance of the Teal Run neighborhood. this new facility will replace the aging and out of date post office currently located on FM 521, and will be adjacent to the Teal Run Exxon and Jack in the Box restaurant. This new facility was opened October 2009.

Fort Bend County does not have a hospital district. OakBend Medical Center serves as the county's charity hospital which the county contracts with.

Education 

School age children in Fresno attend schools in the Fort Bend Independent School District. The community is within the East Division, controlling school board slots 5 through 7. As of 2008 the board members in the slots are Laurie Caldwell, Steve Smelley, and David Reitz, respectively.

Two elementary schools, Lula Belle Goodman Elementary School and Burton Elementary School are located in Fresno's Teal Run neighborhood. A third elementary school, Rosa Parks Elementary School, is in Fresno. A small portion is zoned to Heritage Road Elementary School, outside of Fresno. Some middle school students (grades 6–8) attend Lake Olympia Middle School and Hightower High School in Missouri City, while other Fresno students attend Billy Baines Middle School and Ridge Point High School in the nearby community of Sienna Plantation.

Prior to the opening of Hightower, Elkins High School served Fresno.

Parks and recreation 
Fort Bend County operates the Mustang Community Center in Fresno. The  community center includes one baseball field, benches, one meeting room, two pavilions, one play area, tables, and one walking trail.

References

External links

 
 1990 U.S. Census block maps (had a different shape before Pearland annexations):
 Overall of Fort Bend County
 Parcel 30
 Parcel 31
 Parcel 39
 Parcel 40
 2000 Census block map

Census-designated places in Fort Bend County, Texas
Census-designated places in Texas
Unincorporated communities in Fort Bend County, Texas
Unincorporated communities in Texas
Greater Houston